

Incumbents
President: Ibrahim Boubacar Keïta: Resigned August 19.
Prime Minister: Boubou Cissé: Resigned August 19.
President of the National Assembly: Issaka Sidibé: Parliament dissolved August 19.
National Committee for the Salvation of the People: Established August 19.
Chairman: Colonel Assimi Goïta
Spokesman: Colonel-Major Ismaël Wagué

Events

March
March 26 – Opposition leader Soumaila Cisse and six members of his team are kidnapped.
March 29 – First round of the 2020 Malian parliamentary election

April
April 6 – Bamba attack.
April 19 – 2nd round of the 2020 Malian parliamentary election.
April 24 – Mopti attacks.
April 30 – The Constitutional Court overturns election results for 31 seats and gives Rally for Mali an extra ten seats in Parliament.

May
May 10 – Three Chadian peacekeepers with MINUSMA were killed, and four wounded, in a roadside bomb attack in Aguelhok.
May 23 – Korité, public holiday
May 26 – Twenty people were killed and at least 11 injured when a minibus traveling between Bamako and Narena collided with a truck.
May 30 – Opposition parties establish the Mouvement du 5 juin - Rassemblement des forces patriotiques  (June 5 Movement - Rally of Patriotic Forces).

June
June 3 – Battle of Talahandak.
June 5 – Thousands led by Mahmoud Dicko protest under the banner of the June 5 Movement.
June 11 – Boubou Cisse is reappointed Prime Minister and charged with forming a new government.
June 19 – Tens of thousands of Malians protested in Bamako to demand the resignation of President Ibrahim Boubacar Keita—see 2020 Malian protests.
June 20 – ECOWAS called for new elections to be held due to disputes about the legitimacy of the 2020 Malian parliamentary election.

July
July 5 – President Ibrahim Boubacar Keita meets with imam Mahmoud Dicko, leader of the June 5 protest movement.
July 11 – 12 – Protesters in Bamako clash with security forces, who reportedly fired live rounds at the protesters. 11 people were reportedly killed and another 124 injured.
July 18 – The opposition rejects a new government of national unity proposed by Nigerian President Goodluck Jonathan,
July 27 – ECOWAS calls for a unity government and warns of sanctions.

August
August 10 – Nine new judges for the Constitutional Court were sworn in. Al Jazeera's Nicolas Haque claimed the judges were nominated by a key Keita ally.
August 11 – Police use tear gas and water cannons to disperse crowds in Independence Square after protests are renewed.
August 12 – The June 5 Movement announces daily protests.
August 18 – 2020 Malian coup d'état
Soldiers at a base in Kati, Mali mutinied, detaining several civilian and military officials, sparking protests in nearby Bamako.
President Ibrahim Boubacar Keïta and Prime Minister Boubou Cissé were arrested by mutinying soldiers, as part of a coup d'état reportedly led by Colonel Malick Diaw and General Sadio Camara.
August 19 – President Keïta and Prime Minister Cissé are forced to resign; Parliament is dissolved. The National Committee for the Salvation of the People is established.
August 21 – A report attributed to unidentified sources in the Malian Armed Forces claims that Colonels Malick Diaw and Sadio Camara received training in Russia just a week before the coup.

September
September 7 – ECOWAS renews calls for a quick return to civilian rule.
September 10 – Members of the National Committee for the Salvation of the People (CNSP) meet with civilian and political leaders in order to establish a transitional civilian government by September 15.
September 11 – The National Committee for the Salvation of the People proposes a transitional government led by a president appointed by the military for two years.
September 12 – The CNSP agrees to an 18-month political transition period.
September 15 – Deadline established by ECOWAS to name a civilian government for a one-year transition to free elections.

October
October 5 - Over 100 jihadists were released as part of negotiations to secure the release of Soumaïla Cissé and French aid worker Sophie Pétronin.
October 8 - Sophie Pétronin and Soumaïla Cissé were released from captivity by jihadist militants. Two Italian nationals, Nicola Chiacchio and Pier Luigi Maccalli, were also reported released.
October 9 - Swiss government confirmed that Swiss Christian missionary Béatrice Stöckli was killed in Mali by jihadists.

November
November 13 – French forces kill jihadist leader Ba Ag Moussa near Ménaka Cercle.

December
December 23 – United Nations investigators say both the military and rebel groups have committed war crimes and crimes against humanity since 2012.
December 29 – Three French soldiers are killed by an improvised explosive device (IED) in Mopti Region.

Scheduled events
October 29 – Prophet's birthday
November 5 – Baptism of the Prophet
December 25 – Christmas Day

Deaths
February 14 – Adama Kouyaté, photographer (b. 1928).
July 28 – Zou Diarra, musician (b. 1960).
September 15 – Moussa Traoré, military officer and politician, former President of Mali (b. 1936).
November 10 – Amadou Toumani Touré, former President of Mali (b. 1948).
December 25 – Soumaila Cissé, 71, politician; COVID-19.

See also

2020 in West Africa
COVID-19 pandemic in Mali
COVID-19 pandemic in Africa
2020 Malian protests
2020 Malian parliamentary election
Economic Community of West African States (ECOWAS)
2020 Malian coup d'état
2012 Malian coup d'état
Mali War
Insurgency in the Maghreb (2002–present)
Mopti attacks (Five attacks in 2020)

References

 
2020s in Mali
Years of the 21st century in Mali
Mali